Hingstepeira is a genus of South American orb-weaver spiders first described by Herbert Walter Levi in 1995.

Species
 it contains four species:
Hingstepeira arnolisei Levi, 1995 – Brazil
Hingstepeira dimona Levi, 1995 – Brazil
Hingstepeira folisecens (Hingston, 1932) – Colombia, Brazil, Guyana, Suriname, French Guiana
Hingstepeira isherton Levi, 1995 – Guyana

References

Araneidae
Araneomorphae genera
Spiders of South America